Crambus viettellus is a moth in the family Crambidae. It was described by Stanisław Błeszyński and R.J. Collins in 1962. It is found in the French Southern Territories, where it has been recorded from Île Amsterdam in the Indian Ocean.

References

Crambini
Moths described in 1962
Moths of Africa